The Renault R.S.16 was a Formula One racing car designed by the Renault Sport Formula One Team to compete in the 2016 Formula One season, and marked Renault's return to the sport as a constructor after a five-year absence.

Kevin Magnussen and Jolyon Palmer were the race team drivers, whilst Esteban Ocon was the reserve driver.

Development

Technical team
The chassis was designed by Nick Chester, Chris Cooney, Martin Tolliday and Nicolas Hennel with Bob Bell overseeing the design and production of the car as chief technical officer and Rémi Taffin leading the powertrain design. The car was built in Enstone in Oxfordshire with the engine supplied from Viry-Châtillon in France.

Vehicle development

Nick Chester admitted that preparations for 2016 were limited by financial difficulty within the Lotus team. They also had a contract to use Mercedes engines for the new season, which meant a significant amount of the car that had been designed needed to be modified to fit the Renault power unit. Ahead of the first round of the season, the team admitted that the R.S 16 was a developmental and foundational year, using aero similar to the 2015 car and the engine a lightly modified version of the same years model.  Many of the early modifications seen in testing were made due to FIA mandated requirements, such as the higher cockpit sides.

The team tested the car in a black livery during testing. At the Barcelona test, the team completed 343 laps or 992 miles. Days one and two were limited with just 79 laps across the two days, however Magnussen managed 260 laps alone in the new car.  By the second test, the team completed a total of 776 laps, with Palmer suffering mechcnical errors during his test days.

Upon the start of the season, the FIA confirmed Renault had only used 7 of the available 32 tokens for engine development, leaving scope to progress. An upgrade did materialise for the engines at Monaco, where Magnussen took the B-spec unit, and another went to Daniel Ricciardo at Red Bull Racing with the unit branded TAG.

By July, the team abandoned development of the R.S. 16 instead turning focus to the 2017 car.

Racing performance
The R.S. 16 was officially launched in Paris, in February 2016. 

The R.S. 16 was a poor performer across the season for the team. Retirements were a regular occurrence during the season. In Bahrain, Palmer was unable to start the Grand Prix as his car failed during the formation lap. In Monaco, both cars would retire from the race, Palmer crashed as soon as the safety car allowed the race to begin, while Magnussen was involved in an incident at Rascasse when Daniil Kvyat attempted to unlap himself. Magnussen would retire at three more Grand Prix - Belgium, Malaysia and Abu Dhabi.  Meanwhile, his team mate Palmer chalked up another four retirements before the end of the season in Canada, Britain, Singapore and Brazil.  This meant that across the 21 races, at 9 rounds at least one R.S. 16 did not make the finish.

The team scored points at three races, a seventh place finish in Russia for Magnussen being the cars best finish.  He would score a further point in Singapore, and Palmer a point at Malaysia - his first in F1.

Scoring just 8 points during the season, it represented the team's worst performance since 2014, and for Renault as a constructor since 1978.

Complete Formula One results
(key) (results in bold indicate pole position; results in italics indicate fastest lap)

† – Driver did not finish the Grand Prix, but were classified as they completed more than 90% of the race distance.

Renault Clio R.S. 16

During the season, Renault's developed a Clio R.S. 16 to commemorate the 40th anniversary of Renault Sport and their return to Formula One.  The concept car was painted in the same colours as the R.S.16 Formula One car, and the promotional launch of the car featured Kevin Magnussen driving it at Monaco. The car also featured at the 2016 Goodwood Festival of Speed.

References

R.S.16